Daryl Cowie (born 15 March 1961) is  a former Australian rules footballer who played with St Kilda and Richmond in the Victorian Football League (VFL) and Central Districts in the South Australian National Football League (SANFL).

A ruckman, Cowie was recruited from South Australian Amateur Football League club Gawler Central and made his senior SANFL debut in 1979.

Notes

Sources
 Hornsey, A. (ed.) (1980) Football Times Year Book 1980, South Australian National Football League: Adelaide.

External links 
		

Living people
1961 births
Australian rules footballers from South Australia
St Kilda Football Club players
Richmond Football Club players
Central District Football Club players